Knightwood is a small village in Chandler's Ford which is in Hampshire, England. It is in the civil parish of Valley Park.  It is roughly 6 miles north of Southampton.

References

Villages in Hampshire